Counting problem may refer to:

 Enumeration
 Combinatorial enumeration
 Counting problem (complexity)